The Serpent's Egg is the fourth studio album by the Australian band Dead Can Dance, released on 24 October 1988 by record label 4AD.

Background 

The album was the last produced while Brendan Perry and Lisa Gerrard were a romantic couple. A majority of the album was recorded in a multi-storey apartment block in the Isle of Dogs, London.

Perry discussed the album's title: "In a lot of aerial photographs of the Earth, if you look upon it as a giant organism—a macrocosmos—you can see that the nature of the life force, water, travels in a serpentine way".

Track listing

Reception 

In a retrospective review, AllMusic said, "Perry and Gerrard continued to experiment and improve with The Serpent's Egg, as much a leap forward as Spleen and Ideal was some years previously", heaping particular praise on the album opener "The Host of Seraphim", which it called "so jaw-droppingly good that almost the only reaction is sheer awe".

Legacy 
 Electronic music duo The Chemical Brothers used a reversed sample of "Song of Sophia" in "Song to the Siren", from the album Exit Planet Dust.
 Orkidea sampled "The Host of Seraphim" in his 1999 single "Unity".
 Rapper G Herbo sampled "The Host of Seraphim" on his song "4 Minutes of Hell, Part 3" from his debut mixtape, Welcome to Fazoland.
 Experimental act Ulver covered "In the Kingdom of the Blind the One-Eyed Are Kings" for the Dead Can Dance tribute album Tribute to Dead Can Dance: The Lotus Eaters, released in 2004.
 French rapper Keny Arkana sampled "The Host Of Seraphim" on her song "Je Passe Le Salut", from her album "L'Esquisse Vol. 2" released in 2011.
 "In the Kingdom of the Blind the One-Eyed Are Kings" was also covered by death metal act Cattle Decapitation as a bonus track on their 2019 album Death Atlas.

In popular culture 
"The Host of Seraphim" was featured in the 1992 non-narrative documentary film Baraka (and was included in the film's  soundtrack), the theatrical trailers for the 2003 film Terminator 3: Rise of the Machines and the 2006 film Home of the Brave, in the final scenes of the 2007 film The Mist and in the 2018 film Lords of Chaos.

A short excerpt of "Ullyses" was also used as background music in the BBC Horizon episode #30.7 "Hunt For The Doomsday Asteroid" in February 1994, originally broadcast ahead of the predicted impact of Comet Shoemaker-Levy 9 with the planet Jupiter in July that same year.

"Severance" was used in the "Victims of Circumstance" episode of Miami Vice.

Release history

Personnel 

 Lisa Gerrard – vocals, production on tracks 3–6, 8 and 9
 Brendan Perry – vocals, hurdy-gurdy, production, sleeve design
 Andrew Beesley – viola
 Sarah Buckley – viola
 Tony Gamage – cello
 Alison Harling – violin
 Rebecca Jackson – violin
 David Navarro Sust – vocals

 Technical

 John A. Rivers – co-production on tracks 1, 2, 7 and 10
 Vaughan Oliver – sleeve design (with Brendan Perry)

References

External links 
 
 
 

1988 albums
Dead Can Dance albums
4AD albums
Albums produced by John A. Rivers